The Gold Mountain Range is a mountain range in Esmeralda County, Nevada.

See also 
 Gold Mountain

References 

Mountain ranges of Nevada
Mountain ranges of Esmeralda County, Nevada